Monstrosity may refer to:

Monstrosity (band), a death metal band from Florida
Monstrosity (film), a 1963 science fiction film
Monstrosity!, a 1988 album by the California State University, Los Angeles Jazz Ensemble

See also
Monster
Monstrous birth